Colegio La Florida, A.C. is a private school in Colónia Nápoles, Benito Juárez, Mexico City. It provides education for levels preschool through high school (preparatoria).

References

External links
  

Benito Juárez, Mexico City
Private schools in Mexico
High schools in Mexico City